Trapezia is a genus of guard crabs in the family Trapeziidae. Like other members of this family, they live in association with corals, feeding on coral tissue and mucus, and defending the corals from predators, like starfish. It contains the following species:

Trapezia areolata Dana, 1852
Trapezia bella Dana, 1852
Trapezia bidentata (Forskål, 1775)
Trapezia cheni Galil, 1983
Trapezia corallina Gerstaecker, 1857
Trapezia cymodoce (Herbst, 1801)
Trapezia digitalis Latreille, 1828
Trapezia flavopunctata Eydoux & Souleyet, 1842
Trapezia formosa Stimpson, 1869
Trapezia garthi Galil, 1983
Trapezia globosa Castro, 1997
Trapezia guttata Rüppell, 1830
Trapezia intermedia Miers, 1886
Trapezia lutea Castro, 1997
Trapezia neglecta Castro, 2003
Trapezia punctimanus Odinetz, 1984
Trapezia punctipes Castro, 1997
Trapezia richtersi Galil & Lewinsohn, 1983
Trapezia rufopunctata (Herbst, 1799)
Trapezia septata Dana, 1852
Trapezia serenei Odinetz, 1984
Trapezia speciosa Dana, 1852
Trapezia tigrina Eydoux & Souleyet, 1842

References

Crabs